The Eau Claire Area School District (ECASD) is a school district in western Wisconsin and the eighth-largest district in the state.

The district administers 12 elementary schools, one early learning center, 21 early learning community partner sites, three middle schools, two high schools, and three charter schools.

The district has an enrollment of approximately 11,500 and an annual budget of $145 million. The district's graduation rate was 92.4 percent during the 2012-2013 school year. The ECASD ranks third in the state of Wisconsin for the number of educators who have achieved National Board Certification through the National Board for Professional Teaching Standards.

History
By the early 1850s, about 100 European settlers called Eau Claire home. In 1856, a group of parents built the first public school in Eau Claire. Built out of rough boards, it was located on what is now Barstow Street. During the winter of 1856-57 the school was opened to the public, with John E. Stillman as the first teacher. Large numbers of German and Norwegian immigrants arrived in the 1860s.

Until 1889, there were three school systems in the city of Eau Claire. Each had its own school governance and high school. The Eau Claire Area School District became united in July 1889 by an act of the Wisconsin Legislature. During consolidation in the early 1960s, rural areas and their schools were added to the district. In 1982, the Board of Education voted to become a unified school district. ECASD is a part of Cooperative Educational Service Agency (CESA) 10.

Board of education
The seven-member Eau Claire Area School District Board of Education is the policy-making body responsible for selecting the superintendent and overseeing the district's budget, strategic planning, policy, operations, curriculum, personnel, and facilities. Board commissioners are elected at-large for three-year terms. Two high school students serve as non-voting student representatives to the Board of Education.

Foundation 
The Eau Claire Area School District receives additional financial support from the Eau Claire Public Schools Foundation, a separate 501(c)(3) organization founded in 2008 that solicits charitable donations gifted from community members and businesses.

Early learning program (PreK)

Prairie Ridge Early Learning School (Head Start and Special Education Program)

In addition to Prairie Ridge, the Eau Claire Area School District currently has 21 community partnership sites for its Eau Claire 4 Tomorrow (EC4T) program.
Babes In Toyland Childcare Center
Beautiful Minds Child Care
Chapel Heights Preschool
Children's House Montessori School, Inc.
Color My World Childcare & Preschool Inc.
Days Gone By Early Learning
Genesis Child Development Center
Hand In Hand- A Place for All Children
The Kiddie Patch Early Learning Center
KinderCare Learning Center, LLC - Eau Claire
The Learning Tree Child Care Center
Little Bloomers Childcare
Mayo Clinic Health System Child Development Center
Monsters 2 Munchkins (formerly The Learning Center)
Rachel's Place Early Learning Center
Redeemer Early Learning Programs
Regis Child Development Center
University of Wisconsin-Eau Claire Children's Nature Academy
Western Dairyland Eau Claire Family Literacy Head Start
Western Dairyland Truax Head Start
YMCA Child Development Center

Elementary schools (K-5)
Sherman Elementary School
Longfellow Elementary School
Roosevelt Elementary School
Putnam Heights Elementary School
Manz Elementary School
Lakeshore Elementary School
Sam Davey Elementary School
Robbins Elementary School
Northwoods Elementary School
Meadowview Elementary School
Locust Lane Elementary School
Flynn Elementary School
Chippewa Valley Montessori Charter School

Middle schools (6-8)
Homer E. DeLong Middle School (DeLong Middle School)
Northstar Middle School
South Middle School
Eau Claire Virtual Charter School

High schools (9-12)
North High School
Memorial High School
McKinley Charter School
Eau Claire Virtual Charter School

See also

 List of school districts in Wisconsin
 Wisconsin Department of Public Instruction

References

External links
Eau Claire Area School District official website

 
Eau Claire–Chippewa Falls metropolitan area
School districts in Wisconsin
Organizations based in Eau Claire, Wisconsin
1889 establishments in Wisconsin